Jacob Katzenstein (January 7, 1864 – September 3, 1921) was a German otorhinolaryngologist born in Preußisch Oldendorf.

He studied medicine in Berlin and Freiburg im Breisgau, earning his doctorate in 1888. Afterwards he worked as assistant to otorhinolaryngologist Benno Baginsky (1848–1919) in Berlin. From 1909 he was a lecturer at the University of Berlin.

Katzenstein specialized in research of voice disorders and is known for physiological investigations of the larynx. In 1913 he became editor of the Archiv für experimentelle und klinische Phonetik (Archive for experimental and clinical phonetics).

Selected publications 
 Über die Medianstellung des Stimmbandes bei Recurrenslähmung (Virchow's Archiv 1892).
 Über die Innervation des m. crico-thyreoideus - On innervation of the median cricothyroids.
 Weitere Mitteilungen über die Innervation des m. crico-thyreoideus (1894) - New information on innervation of the median cricothyroids.
 Die Orthoskopie des Larynx (Archive for Laryngology IV) - Orthoscopy of the larynx.
 Die Autoskopie des Nasenrachenraums.
 Zur Frage der Posticuslähmung, (Part 1 with Arthur Kuttner, Archive for Laryngology VIII; Part 2 Ib. IX).
 Experimentelle Beiträge zur Physiologie des Kehlkopfs, (with Arthur Kuttner, Archive for Anatomy and Physiology 1899) - Experimental contributions to the physiology of the larynx.

References 
 Zeno.org translated biography @ Pagel: Biographical Dictionary
 Uniklininkum-Leipzig Essential Prerequisites for the Development of Phoniatrics

1864 births
1921 deaths
People from Minden-Lübbecke
German otolaryngologists
Academic staff of the Humboldt University of Berlin
Academic staff of the University of Freiburg